The women's omnium competition at the 2021 UEC European Track Championships was held on 7 October 2021.

Results

Scratch race

Tempo race

Elimination race

Points race and final standings
The final ranking is given by the sum of the points obtained in the 4 specialties.

References

Women's omnium
European Track Championships – Women's omnium